This List of pickleball organizations identifies pickleball resources around the world.

USA Pickleball
USA Pickleball was the first national pickleball organization established. Initially named the United States Amateur Pickleball Association (USAPA) when it was formed in 1984, it reorganized as the USA Pickleball Association (also USAPA) in 2005. The organization adopted the name USA Pickleball (USAP) in 2020. USAPA published the first official rule book in 1984, and published the USA Pickleball Association Official Tournament Rulebook in 2008.

International Federation of Pickleball

The International Federation of Pickleball (IFP) is the highest governing body for the sport of Pickleball. The organization was first established in 2010 by the USA Pickleball Association (USAPA), now USA Pickleball (USAP). Inaugural members were the United States, Canada, Spain, and India.

List of IFP members
Listed below are International Federation of Pickleball member countries in order by member type and when they joined. As of April 2022 eleven member countries have withdrawn their memberships from the IFP.

References

pickleball